The sub-great bass recorder, also known as contra great bass and contrabass, is a recorder with the range C–d1 (g1). 
It is manufactured in both bent ("knick") and square designs. The design with a square or rectangular cross-sections was first patented in 1975 by Joachim and Herbert Paetzold. They are made from plywood and have a doubled-back bore like a bassoon, which reduces the exterior length of the instrument. They also have wooden keys. Through this special and proprietary design, the instrument can be played with a very short bocal.

The American recorder player Michael Barker has combined a Paetzold contrabass recorder with two computer-controlled synthesizers to create what he calls a "midified blockflute".

The sub-great bass recorder was developed by Herbert Paetzold in Ebenhofen. Today, this recorder size is produced and distributed by the workshop Kunath under the brand name "Paetzold by Kunath".

References

Internal fipple flutes
Recorders (musical instruments)